Joseph Liu Yuanren (16 March 1923 - 20 April 2005) was a Chinese Catholic Bishop of the Diocese of Jiangsu, China. He also served as vice-president of Chinese Patriotic Catholic Association from 1998 until his death in 2005.

He was a member of the Standing Committee of the Chinese People's Political Consultative Conference.

Biography
Liu was born in Qidong, Jiangsu, on March 16, 1923, to a Catholic family. His six generations of ancestors were Catholics. After graduating from the Xilei Middle School, he was accepted to the Haimen Catholic College of Literature. He became a priest on June 3, 1953 in Xuhui District of Shanghai. He taught at his alma mater between 1953 and 1958. After the 3rd Plenary Session of the 11th Central Committee of the Communist Party of China, the policy of religious freedom was implemented. In 1982 he was a pastor of the Cathedral of the Immaculate Conception, Nanjing, Jiangsu. In May 1992 he was appointed as vice-president of the National Seminary of the Chinese Catholic Church. In December 1993 he had been made a bishop of the Catholic Diocese of Nanjing without consent of the pope and was excommunicated latae sententiae. In 1998 he was elected president of the Bishops Conference of the Catholic Church in China (BCCCC), president of the National Seminary of the Chinese Catholic Church and vice-president of Chinese Patriotic Catholic Association. In 2004 he was elected vice-president of the China Religious Peace Commission. He died on April 20, 2005.

See also
 Roman Catholic Archdiocese of Nanking

References

1923 births
2005 deaths
Politicians from Nantong
21st-century Roman Catholic bishops in China
People's Republic of China politicians from Jiangsu
20th-century Roman Catholic bishops in China